Wazza Elmo Kambindu (born 26 May 1993) is a Namibian footballer who plays as a forward for Chippa United and the Namibia national football team.

International statistics

Scores and results list Namibia's goal tally first, score column indicates score after each Kambindu goal.

References

1993 births
Living people
People from Otjiwarongo
Namibian men's footballers
Association football forwards
Mighty Gunners F.C. players
CD Costa do Sol players
Chippa United F.C. players
Namibia international footballers
Namibia Premier League players
Namibia A' international footballers
2020 African Nations Championship players
Namibian expatriate footballers
Expatriate footballers in Mozambique
Namibian expatriate sportspeople in Mozambique
Expatriate soccer players in South Africa
Namibian expatriate sportspeople in South Africa
Moçambola players
South African Premier Division players